IROC XVI was the sixteenth year of IROC competition, which took place in 1992. It was the third year the Dodge Daytona was used in competition, and continued the format introduced in IROC VIII. Race one took place on the Daytona International Speedway, race two took place at Talladega Superspeedway, and races three and four ran at Michigan International Speedway. Ricky Rudd won the series championship and $175,000, despite not winning a race.

The roster of drivers and final points standings were as follows:

Race results

Race One, Daytona International Speedway
Friday, February 14, 1992

one *: Bonus points for leading the most laps.two **: Bonus points for leading the 2nd most laps.three ***: Bonus points for leading the 3rd most laps.

Average speed: 182.556 mphCautions: 1 (Lap 33, Pete Halsmer crash)Margin of victory: .5 clLead changes: 18

Race Two, Talladega Superspeedway
Saturday, May 2, 1992

one *: Bonus points for leading the most laps.two **: Bonus points for leading the 2nd most laps.three ***: Bonus points for leading the 3rd most laps (did not occur in this race so not awarded).

Average speed: 191.722 mphCautions: 1 (Lap 15, Arie Luyendyk crash)Margin of victory: .25 clLead changes: 15

Race Three, Michigan International Speedway
Saturday, August 1, 1992 

one *: Bonus points for leading the most laps.two **: Bonus points for leading the 2nd most laps.three ***: Bonus points for leading the 3rd most laps.

Average speed: 157.654 mphCautions: noneMargin of victory: 2.6 secLead changes: 3

Race Four, Michigan International Speedway
Saturday, August 15, 1992

one *: Bonus points for leading the most laps.two **: Bonus points for leading the 2nd most laps.three ***: Bonus points for leading the 3rd most laps (did not occur in this race so not awarded).

Average speed: 158.8 mphCautions: noneMargin of victory: 1 clLead changes: 1

Notes
 Davey Allison withdrew from the series due to injury after the first two races.
 Scott Pruett and Hurley Haywood tied for ninth place in the final championship standings, but the position was awarded to Pruett due to a higher finishing position in the final race
 Second place between Harry Gant and Ricky Rudd was declared a dead heat & both drives were awarded 2nd place points.
 Pete Halsmer did not start race two due to injury, and received last place points.
 Davey Allison withdrew from the series due to injury after the first two races, and was awarded last place points for the final two races.

References

External links
IROC XVI History - IROC Website

International Race of Champions
1992 in American motorsport